= Camping World RV Sales 200 =

At one time, four NASCAR races were known as the Camping World RV Sales 200:

- For the NASCAR Xfinity Series race at New Hampshire Motor Speedway from 2007–present, see ROXOR 200
- For the NASCAR Xfinity Series fall race at Dover International Speedway from 2008–present, see Use Your Melon Drive Sober 200
- For the NASCAR Camping World Truck Series race at The Milwaukee Mile from 2008 to 2009, see Copart 200
- For the NASCAR Camping World Truck Series race at Gateway International Raceway from 2009–present, see CarShield 200
